Zhufan (local accent:zhuf, or Juf) also called West Zhufan or Xizhufan , is an administrative village governed by Shilianghe Town of Donghai County, in the north of Jiangsu Province, China.

The village lies to the west of Ganyu of Lianyungang. It borders Shandong Province to the northeast, and Ganyu to the northwest. Tangzi River is located in the east, and Zhufan River is located in the southwest.

Until the 1980s, Zhufan was located on the Tangzi River's western bank, earning it the nickname Hexi (River West) among the locals. Due to flood damage in the 1980s, a new village was built to the northeast of the old village, and the village is now located on the Tangzi River's eastern bank. It now includes Wang Zhufan, Wang Banlu and Yuan Banlu.

Geography

Landscape and rivers
The village is located in the low flat plain between the rivers Zhufan and Tangzi. The river serves as the boundary between the villages.

Tangzi River is formed by the confluence of two rivers. The larger one flows southward from the eastern upland area of Yushan Town in Linshu County, Shandong Province. The small one flows southwest from Ganyu County in Jiangsu Province's western hilly countries. The two rivers enter Zhufan to the south of G327 and meet to the west of the Public Tomb Area and to the east of Zhufan's Bamboo Yard. Then it flows southward, then eastward for 570 meters at Yandan Jing (Duck Egg Well), then southward again. Finally, it comes together in Reservoir Shilianghe, west of Mengjialing Village.

River Zhufan has two sources as well. The small source, also known as River Zhufan, flows southward from Mount Cangma in Linshu Town, Linshu County, and converges in Reservoir Jiaolong. River Mutuan is the large source, which formed in the western hilly countries of Yushan Town in Linshu County. The two sources meet between Lietuan Village and Zhangtuan Village, flow southeastward, and meet at Reservoir Shilianghe in Dongwozi Village's east.

Before the construction of Reservoir Shilianghe in 1958, River Tangzi was also known historically as River Dongjiawan after Dongjiawan Village, which was located to the west of Mengjialing Village. In the past, River Tangzi and River Zhufan combined near Sanjiaowang Village to form River Dasha, a larger river. After then, River Shiliang, which had been created from Mount Maling, merged with River Dasha. In Linhongkou, the River Dasha flowed southeast and entered the Yellow Sea. The New River Shoo was created after 1949 from the riverbeds of the River Shilianghe and the River Dasha.

Climate
Zhufan has a monsoon-influenced climate with generous summer precipitation, cold, dry winters, and hot, humid in summers. Under the Köppen climate classification, is in the transition from the humid subtropical zone (Cwa) to the humid continental zone (Dwa), though favouring the former. More than half of the annual precipitation of  falls in July and August alone, and the frost-free period is above 200 days.

Economy
Zhufan's economy is heavily dependent on crop farming and construction. Crops cover wheat, paddy, peanut and corn, and soybean. The other crops such as Red adzuki beans, and mung beans are planted occasionally on some small fields. Usually, women and old men are the main laborers in farming. Most of the younger men are construction workers.

There is some primitive industry in wood and meat processing and cement products. They only provide a few industrial products.

Zhufan has a country fair for the adjoining areas. The villagers buy and sell food, clothes, necessities, hardware, and farming tools, on some fixed days in every month as per Lunar Calendar. There are also some small markets in the village.

Demography

Population
According to China's 2010 census information, the village had a population of 3200. All the villagers are Han Chinese.

Wang is the most popular family name in the village. It covers two families: Sanhuaitang and Yeyutang .

The family of Sanghuaitang declares that they came from Danglu, a little village situated near Huaguoshan of Lianyungang. they do not know when they arrived at this village in paper or oral legend. But they arrived at this village much earlier than the family of Yeyutang.

The family of Yeyutang came from Dengzhou of Shandong Province during Chongzhen (BC1628~BC1644) (year's name of Emperor Sizong Zhu Youjian) in the Ming dynasty. The ancestor who came to the village was a fisherman. The family regard Xinzhuang, a village near Qingkou of Ganyu County, as their home place.

However, the latest Genealogy research shows that the two families are descended from a man named Wang Ying, who lived in the Later period of Southern Song. Wang Ying's elder son became the ancestor of Yeyutang Family, and the junior was the ancestor of Sanhuaitang Family.

Other families' names cover Zhu , Xu , Xiang , Li , Yuan , Liu , Lǚ , Zhang ,etc., and about 10% of families use them totally. But there is no Wang's family in Yuan Banlu.

Religion

Chinese folk beliefs are practiced widely. The villagers worship ancestors, ghost and kinds of gods. But there are no fixed religious places and rites. The Villagers can finish the rites by themselves in the ancestors' tombs or the courtyards.

Christianity is also practiced by some people. But most Christians are old men and women. They only take part in religious gatherings, listen to the preach and sing religious songs. They cannot distinguish Christ from other gods worshiped by most of the Chinese people usually. They believe that Christ may have greater power than common Chinese gods. Christianity is regarded by some villagers as a kind of cult because Christians are usually more passionate about religious affairs rather than other topics.

Dialect
The dialect of Zhufan is kind of Central Plain Mandarin. However, there are many differences from other Central Plain Mandarin, because it lies in the most eastern part of the dialect. Being adjacent to Jialiao Man Mandarin Zone, it is affected by Jiaoliao Mandarin, and keeps some characters of pronunciation and many words of Jialiao Mandarin.

The system of consonants and vowels of local dialect is much more like Ganyu Dialect, which is a kind of dialect more like Jiaoliao Mandarin than Central Plain Mandarin. But the tones are more similar to Central Plain Dialect than Ganyu Dialect. The consonant of /w/ and vowel of /u/ do not exist, and are replaced by /v/. There is also no initial letter R in Standard Mandarin. For example, the Re (热,hot) and Ye (叶,leaf) are homonyms in the local dialect. Some consonant clusters exist in the local accent, for example, kl and pl.

Comparatively, the local people speak usually a little quicker.

Administrative Managing System and Politics

There are three natural villages in Zhufan since the early 1950s. The three natural villages are: Wang Zhufan , Yuan Banlu and Wang Banlu . But the natural villages are not village managing units. The basic managing unit of the village is the villager group according to Organic Law of Village Committees. Zhufan is divided into 7 villager groups. Wang Zhufan covers 1st – 5th villager group; Wang Banlu is the 6th villager group and Yuan Banlu 7th villager group.

In the Chinese mainland, all the administrative villages serve as a fundamental organizational unit for its rural population, not as the part of a system of government. As a bureaucratic entity, the director of the village committee is a corporate representative, and is also called Village Chief by the villagers traditionally. The election of the director of the village committee is held every three years. The influence over the election is usually from the township government, large clans, the rich, and even the gangsters. The latest election was held in 2011.

The Chinese Communist Party is the sole legal party. Its secretary of the village branch is the supreme leader de facto of the village. The percentage of communist party members is less than 1% of all villagers. And most of them are only statistical members of the Party.

History

The name Zhufan was first mentioned by a Genealogy Book of Yeyutang Wangshi, written in the 1850s. But the official documents shortly after, the name of the village was written as “诸樊” or “朱樊”.

There are no records that record when the village was founded. But according to the legend, the earliest residents were all members of the Fan family, and the village was also called Fanjia Zhuang (the village of Fan family). Hundreds of years later, the family of Zhu gradually replaced the Fan and became the main residents. Thus, the name of the village changed to Zhufan Zhuang (the village of Fan and Zhu families. Years later, the Wang family came to this village and became the main residents in the early Ming dynasty (1368–1644). The name of the village changed to Wangzhufan and is fixed.

There is a historic site of ancient Zhuqi in Gucheng Village of Ganyu County, about 1.5 km northeastward from Zhufan. Zhuqi is a small vassal state, whose founder and founding time are all not clear. During early Dong Zhou, it was conquered by State of Lu and became one of Lu's border city. From the Qin dynasty to the Tang dynasty, zhuqi had been the county site before it was combined with Huairen County (i.e. Ganyu County) 

In the Ming dynasty and Qing dynasty, it became the border of Yichow Fu of Shandong province and was governed by Lanshan County.

During the Republic of China, Lanshan County changed its name to Linyi County. Jufan is a village under Linshu Town of Linyi County. Linshu Town became the Fifth District of Linyi County in 1934.

During the Anti-Japan War, the Communist Party of China came here and domain rural areas. Zhufan became the center of areas controlled by the Communist Party and the seat of division headquarters of the 18th Army 115 Division. The Communist Party divided the eastern part of Linyi County, the western part of Ganyu County, and the northeastern part of Tancheng County to find a new county named Linshu. Zhufan became a village in this new county.

After the Communist Party obtained control over China's Mainland, most areas were taken apart and adjusted. Zhufan was divided into five small villages: Wang Zhufan, Xu Zhufan, Yao Zhufan, Wang Banlu, and Yuan Banlu. Every village has its own basic branch of the Communist Party ruling the village.

In 1962, the Reservoir Shilianghe was completed and stored water. Thus, Zhufan became a submerged area, and villagers had to move northward. But the new houses are very bad because of the corruption of the Communist officials. Many houses collapsed when rainstorms came in summer. So the villagers had to move back to the old site to build new houses by themselves.

In April 1971, Zhufan was put under Jiangsu Province. The villagers were not willing to live in Ganyu County, so the Zhufan became a village of Donghai County. In 1978, Zhufan was a village in Nanchen Town.

During the early 1980s, the villagers built their new home in the farthest northeastern part of the village near G327.

In February 2013, Nanchen Town and Shilianghe Town were combined into a new Shilianghe Town.

References

Lianyungang
Villages in China